The history of the administrative divisions of China before 1912 is quite complex. Across history, what is called 'China' has taken many shapes, and many political organizations. For various reasons, both the borders and names of political divisions have changed—sometimes to follow topography, sometimes to weaken former states by dividing them, and sometimes to realize a philosophical or historical ideal. For recent times, the number of recorded tiny changes is quite large; by contrast, the lack of clear, trustworthy data for ancient times forces historians and geographers to draw approximate borders for respective divisions.  But thanks to imperial records and geographic descriptions, political divisions may often be redrawn with some precision. Natural changes, such as changes in a river's course (known for the Huang He, but also occurring for others), or loss of data, still make this issue difficult for ancient times.

Summary

Pre-Qin era

Before the establishment of the Qin dynasty, China was ruled by a network of kings, nobles, and tribes. There was no unified system of administrative divisions. According to ancient texts, China in the Xia and Zhou dynasties consisted of nine zhou, but various texts differ as to the names and even functions of these .

During the Zhou dynasty, the nation was nominally controlled by the "Son of Heaven". In reality, however, the country was divided into competing states, each with a hereditary head, variously styled "prince", "duke", or "king". The rivalry of these groups culminated in the Warring States period, which ended with the victory of Qin.

Jun under the Qin dynasty 

After the Kingdom of Qin managed to subdue the rest of China in 221 BC, the First Emperor divided his realm into relatively small commanderies, which were divided into still smaller counties. Repudiating the fiefs of the Zhou, both levels were centrally and tightly controlled as part of a meritocratic system. There was also a separately-administered capital district known as the Neishi. Control over some of these, particularly modern Fujian (Minzhong Commandery), was particularly loose.

There were also four other commanderies ,  and and 23 unaffiliated counties.

Zhou under the Han dynasty 

The Han dynasty initially added a top level of "kingdoms" or "principalities" (王国, wángguó), each headed by a local king or a prince of the imperial family. From the establishment of the dynasty, however, the tendency was to slowly absorb this quasi-federal structure into the imperial bureaucracy. After the Rebellion of the Seven States, the system was standardized, replacing the kingdoms and principalities with thirteen provinces (州, zhōu).

 Provinces
 Commanderies
 Counties

* One of the original provinces established during the Eastern Han dynasty

Ping was formed out of You; Qin out of Liang (涼/凉); Liang (梁) and Ning out of Yi; and Guang out of Jiao. Jiao had been established from a territory called Jiaozhi (交趾); Si too was a new creation, its territory formerly administered by a metropolitan commandant (司隷校尉, Sīlì xiàowèi) with capacities similar to the provincial governors'. Shuofang (朔方, Shuòfāng), a similar territory in northern Shaanxi, was merged into Bing rather than becoming a full province in its own right.

Provinces during the Jin dynasty and the Southern and Northern dynasties

Throughout the Han dynasty, the Three Kingdoms period, and the early period of Jin dynasty, the administrative division system remained intact. This changed, however, with the invasion of nomadic tribes from the north in 310s, who disrupted the unity of China and set up a variety of governments.

After the Yongjia Disaster, Jin dynasty lost a significant amount of territories in the north. Sixteen Kingdoms were established by barbarians in the Yellow River plain, while the court of Jin dynasty shifted to Jiankang and survived in the south as Eastern Jin. Among previous provinces of Jin dynasty, only a few remained. They include:
Yangzhou
Jiangzhou
Jingzhou
Ningzhou
Jiaozhou
Guangzhou
Yuzhou (only the southern part)
Xuzhou (only the southern part)

With the loss of traditional lands in the north to nomadic tribes, many ethnic Han moved south as refugees with the Jin court. The Jin government established "immigrant provinces" (qiaozhou) based on the homelands of immigrants. For example, while Yan-, Qing- and Youzhou were lost, Southern Yan-, Southern Qing- and Southern You- were established in the south.

Eastern Jin launched several expeditions in its last years and regained many territories. When the Liu Song replaced Eastern Jin as the first Southern Dynasties, it re-constructed the administrative divisions. For example, Yanzhou, Yongzhou and Jizhou were restored. During the reign of Emperor Xiaowu, Liu Song had 22 provinces (Zhou), 238 commanderies (Jun) and 1179 counties (Xian):
Yangzhou
Xuzhou
Southern Xuzhou
Yanzhou
Southern Yanzhou
Yuzhou
Southern Yuzhou
Jiangzhou
Qingzhou
Jizhou
Sizhou
Jingzhou
Yingzhou
Xiangzhou
Yongzhou
Liangzhou
Qinzhou
Yizhou
Ningzhou
Guangzhou
Jiaozhou
Yuezhou
Later, due to the conflict with Northern Wei and the change of territories, Liu Song's provincial divisions changed several times. Liu Song's successors, Southern Qi and Liang dynasty, kept the bulk part of Liu Song's administrative divisions except for the Shandong peninsula which was lost again to the north. Liang dynasty also set first counties on the Hainan Island. The last of Southern Dynasties, the Chen dynasty, however, lost every division to the north of the Yangtze river.

Sixteen Kingdoms of the northern China were unified by Northern Wei, the empire established by Xianbei people. Although emperors of Northern Wei tried to be Sinicized, there were serious internal struggles between Xianbei and Han styles in Northern Wei. As a result, the administrative divisions of Northern Wei were pretty complicated and unstable. The southern part of the empire used the Han-style administrative system, while the northern part of the empire was relatively poorly organized. Due to the rivalry and wars between the north and south, the area between Huai River and Yangtze River suffered significant population loss. After Northern Wei took that area from Liu Song and Southern Qi, many towns and villages there were vacant. Therefore, the administrative divisions in those areas were poorly designed. Provinces of Northern Wei include:
Daizhou
Youzhou
Yingzhou
Pingzhou
Dingzhou
Jizhou
Jizhou
Yanzhou
Yuzhou
Jingzhou
Luozhou (Luoyang)
Yongzhou (Chang'an)
Huazhou
Qinzhou
Weizhou
Jingzhou
Sizhou
Bingzhou
Eastern Qinzhou
Eastern Yongzhou

To defend the invasion of Rouran, Northern Wei set many (initially six) military towns in the north, and turned the northern part into military districts. After shifting the capital city from Pingcheng to Luoyang, Northern Wei gradually lost many territories to Rouran and northwestern states. Then, those military towns rebelled and weakened the Xianbei empire. At last, the internal struggle split Northern Wei into Eastern Wei and Western Wei, which would be replaced by Northern Qi and Northern Zhou, respectively. Northern Qi and Northern Zhou invaded the Southern Dynasties and occupied many areas of the Chen dynasty.

In their early years, both Northern Qi and Northern Zhou redesigned the administrative divisions. Many provinces of the former Northern Wei dynasty were abolished and merged with each other. Some new provinces were established. Provinces of Northern Qi include:
Youzhou
Shuozhou
Sizhou
Eastern Xuzhou
Yuzhou
Yangzhou
Luozhou
Bingzhou
Jinzhou
Huaizhou
Eastern Yongzhou
Jianzhou

Provinces of Northern Zhou include:
Yongzhou
Jingzhou
Xiangzhou
Anzhou
Xingzhou
Jinzhou
Liangzhou
Lizhou
Yizhou
Jiangzhou
Yuanzhou
Qinzhou
Xunzhou
Yuzhou
Zhongzhou
Hezhou
Liangzhou
Xiazhou
Ningzhou
Western Ningzhou (Xiningzhou)
Southern Ningzhou (Nanningzhou)
At the same time, the Chen dynasty in the south had similar provinces with its forerunners (Liu Song, Southern Qi and Liang dynasty), but some provinces in the north and west were ceded to northern dynasties. Chen redesigned administrative divisions. It set 42 provinces, but gave provinces different ranks. Tier-1 provinces of Chen dynasty include:
Yangzhou
Southern Yuzhou
Jiangzhou
Guangzhou
Xiangzhou
Jiaozhou
Eastern Ningzhou (Dongningzhou)

In their later years, however, Northern Qi and Northern Zhou set up many new provinces to represent areas not under their control. For example, Northern Qi set up Guangzhou which were controlled by Chen dynasty and Yizhou which were controlled by Northern Zhou. In the area between Yangtze and Huai rivers, people who ran away to escape from wars in earlier periods started to move back to their hometowns. However, many of their original hometowns were destroyed completely. As a result, people from the same town gathered and established new towns and named those towns with original names. This led to the situation that many towns with the same name were established. For example, within Luozhou and Yuzhou, there were multiple counties named Chenliu.

Chen dynasty also set up a series of new immigrant provinces along the Yangtze River, such as the Southern Xuzhou and Northern Jiangzhou, etc. The administrative division began to mess up. Northern and Southern dynasties were eventually reunified by Sui dynasty in 589. At that time, there were hundreds of provinces all over China.

Zhou under Sui dynasty 

By the time unity was finally reestablished by the Sui dynasty, the provinces had been divided and redivided so many times by different governments that they were almost the same size as commanderies, rendering the two-tier system superfluous. As such, the Sui merged the two together. In English, this merged level is translated as "prefectures". In Chinese, the name changed between zhou and jun several times before being finally settled on zhou. Based on the apocryphal Nine Province system, the Sui restored nine zhou.

The Sui had 9 provinces, 190 prefectures, 1,225 counties, and about 9 million registered households or approximately 50 million people.

Circuits under the Tang dynasty 

Emperor Taizong (r. 626−649) set up 10 "circuits" (道, dào) in 627 as inspection areas for imperial commissioners monitoring the operation of prefectures, rather than a new primary level of administration. In 639, there were 10 circuits, 43 commanderies (都督府, dūdū fǔ), and 358 prefectures (州 and later 府, fǔ). In 733, Emperor Xuanzong expanded the number of circuits to 15 by establishing separate circuits for the areas around Chang'an and Luoyang, and by splitting the large Shannan and Jiangnan circuits into 2 and 3 new circuits respectively. He also established a system of permanent inspecting commissioners, though without executive powers.

The Tang dynasty also created military districts (藩鎮/藩镇, fānzhèn) controlled by military commissioners (節度使/节度使, jiédushǐ) charged with protecting frontier areas susceptible to foreign attack (similar to the Western marches and marcher lords). This system was eventually generalized to other parts of the country as well and essentially merged into the circuits. Just as in the West, the greater autonomy and strength of the commissioners permitted insubordination and rebellion, which in China led to the Five Dynasties and Ten Kingdoms period.

 Circuits and Military Districts
 Commanderies and Prefectures
 Counties

* Circuits established under Xuanzong, as opposed to Taizong's original ten circuits.

** Circuits established under Xuanzong by dividing Taizong's Jiangnan and Shannan circuits.

Other Tang-era circuits include the West Lingnan, Wu'an, and Qinhua circuits.

Circuits under the Liao, Song and Jurchen-led Jin dynasties 

The Liao dynasty was further divided into five "circuits", each with a capital city. The general idea for this system was taken from the Balhae, although no captured Balhae cities were made into circuit capitals. The five capital cities were Shangjing, meaning Supreme Capital, which is located in modern-day Inner Mongolia; Nanjing, meaning Southern Capital, which is located near modern-day Beijing; Dongjing, meaning Eastern Capital, which is located near modern-day Liaoning; Zhongjing, meaning Central Capital, which is located in modern-day Hebei province near the Laoha river; and Xijing, meaning Western Capital, which is located near modern-day Datong. Each circuit was headed by a powerful viceroy who had the autonomy to tailor policies to meet the needs of the population within his circuit. Circuits were further subdivided into administrations called fu, which were metropolitan areas surrounding capital cities, and outside of metropolitan areas were divided into prefectures called zhou, which themselves were divided into counties called xian.

The Song dynasty abolished the commissioners and renamed their circuits 路 (lù, which however is still usually translated into English as "circuits"). They also added a number of army/military prefectures (州级军 zhouji jun, or simply 軍/军, jūn).

 Circuits (路, lù)
 Prefectures (larger: 府, fǔ; smaller: 州, zhōu; military: 軍/军, jūn)
 Counties

The Jurchens invaded China proper in Jin–Song wars of the 12th century. In 1142, peace was formalized between the Jurchen Jin dynasty and the Southern Song dynasty, which was forced to cede all of North China to the Jurchens.

By the beginning of the 13th century, the Jurchens had moved their capital to Zhongdu (modern Beijing) and had adopted Chinese administrative structures. The Song dynasty also maintained the same structure over the southern half of China that they continued to govern.

Provinces under the Yuan dynasty 

The Mongol-led Yuan dynasty, founded in 1271 and unified all of China proper in 1279, introduced the precursors to the modern provinces as a new primary administrative level:

 Provinces (行中書省/行中书省, xíngzhōngshūshěng)
 Circuits (路, lù)
 Prefectures (larger: 府, fǔ; smaller: 州, zhōu)
 Counties

The area around the capital, corresponding to modern Hebei, Shandong, Shanxi, central Inner Mongolia, Beijing, and Tianjin, was called the Central Region (腹裏/腹里) and not put into any province, but was directly controlled by the Central Secretariat (Zhongshu Sheng). The Tibetan Plateau was controlled by the Bureau of Buddhist and Tibetan Affairs (Xuanzheng Yuan).

Provinces under the Ming dynasty 

The Ming dynasty continued with this system and had provinces that were almost exactly the same as those in modern China proper. The differences were Huguang had not yet been split into Hubei and Hunan; Gansu and Ningxia were still part of Shaanxi; Anhui and Jiangsu were together as South Zhili; portions of what are today the provinces of Hebei, Beijing, and Tianjin were part of the province of North Zhili; and Hainan, Shanghai, and Chongqing were still parts of their original provinces at this time. This makes for a total of 15 provinces. Jiaozhi Province, formerly known as Jiaozhi, Jiaozhou, Lingnan and Rinan, was also re-established in 1407 when the area encompassing northern and central Vietnam was reconquered for the fourth time. However, the province eventually emerged as its own state in 1428 under the Later Lê dynasty of Đại Việt.

Provinces and Feudatory Regions under the Qing dynasty 

The Manchu-led Qing dynasty was the last dynasty of China. The Qing government applied the following system over China proper:

 Provinces (省, shěng)
 Circuits (道, dào)
 Prefectures (府, fǔ), Independent Departments (直隸州/直隶州, zhílìzhōu), and Independent Subprefectures (直隸廳/厅, zhílìtīng)
 Counties (縣/县, xiàn), Departments (散州, sànzhōu), Subprefectures (散廳/散厅, sàntīng)

The Qing split Shaanxi into Shaanxi and Gansu, Huguang into Hubei and Hunan, and South Zhili into Jiangsu and Anhui. Hebei was now called Zhili rather than North Zhili. These provinces are now nearly identical to modern ones. Collectively they are called the "Eighteen Provinces", a concept that endured for several centuries as synonymous to China proper.

This system applied only to China proper, with the rest of the empire under differently systems, official name is "Feudatory Regions"   (藩部, fān bù). Manchuria, Xinjiang, and Outer Mongolia were ruled by military generals assigned by the Lifan Yuan, while Inner Mongolia was organized into leagues. The Qing court put Amdo under their direct control and organized it as Qinghai and also sent imperial commissioners to Tibet (Ü-Tsang and western Kham, approximately the area of the present-day Tibet Autonomous Region) to oversee its affairs.

In the late 19th century, Xinjiang and Taiwan were both set up as provinces. However, Taiwan was ceded to Imperial Japan after the First Sino-Japanese War in 1895. Near the end of the dynasty, Manchuria was also reorganized into three more provinces (Fengtian, Jilin, Heilongjiang), bringing the total number to twenty-two. In 1906, the first romanization system of Mandarin Chinese, postal romanization, was officially sanctioned by the Imperial Postal Joint-Session Conference, which showed in the following table.

See also
 Administrative divisions of China
 Physiographic macroregions of China

References

Sources and further reading

External links
Summary of terms
Historical map scans – maps of various sheng, dao, fu, ting, and  xian of the late Qing era.
The province in history by John Fitzgerald

Provinces of China
Administrative divisions of China
Former administrative divisions of China